András Tóth (born 5 September 1949) is a Hungarian former footballer who played at the 1978 FIFA World Cup. A forward, he played for Újpesti Dózsa, MTK-VM and Belgian club Lierse at club level. Internationally, he made 17 appearances scoring one goal for the Hungary national team.

References

External links
 

Living people
1949 births
Sportspeople from Budapest
Hungarian footballers
Association football forwards
Hungary international footballers
1978 FIFA World Cup players
Újpest FC players
MTK Budapest FC players
Lierse S.K. players
Hungarian expatriate footballers
Hungarian expatriate sportspeople in Belgium
Expatriate footballers in Belgium